Burning Empires is an EP from VNV Nation. It contains remixes and alternate versions of tracks from their popular album Empires, plus the "Standing" single. It is a limited edition release of 4,700 copies. The album was made available on the iTunes Music Store, as well as on Napster and Amazon MP3 Downloads.

"Further" and "Radius²" were the only entirely new tracks on Burning Empires.  "Lastlight" was a remix of "Firstlight"/"Arclight" from Empires.  The exclusive version of "Savior" has a full vocal track (the previously released album version is an instrumental).

A cover of "Further" by the band LifeForce was used in the video game Iji, and while not released on any CD, it was made available for public download.

"Standing" was ranked #1 on the German Alternative Charts (DAC) Top 100 Singles of 2000.

Track listing

References

VNV Nation albums
2000 EPs